Julián Isaías Rodríguez Díaz (born 16 December 1942)  is a Venezuelan politician, diplomat and lawyer.  He was appointed the vice president of Venezuela on 29 January 2000 by Hugo Chávez, and served in the post until 26 December 2000.

Career 
Rodríguez Díaz earned his law degree and specialized in labor law at the Universidad Central de Venezuela, where he began his political activities with the political party Democratic Action. He left Democratic Action in 1967 together with Luis Beltrán Prieto Figueroa to join the new Movimiento Electoral del Pueblo, which he participated in until 1981. In 1990 he served as Attorney Aragua.

In the elections of November 1998 he was elected to the Venezuelan Senate, representing the state of Aragua.

On 29 January 2000, he was appointed as the first executive vice president of Venezuela. Eleven months later, on December 26, with the majority vote of the National Assembly, he was appointed as Attorney General of the Republic, a position he held until November 2007.

He was appointed Second Vice-President of the 2017 Constituent National Assembly on 4 August 2017 but he is replaced by Elvis Amoroso a month later.

Sanctions 

In November 2017, Isaías Rodríguez was sanctioned by the United States Office of Foreign Assets Control after the 2017 Venezuelan Constituent Assembly election.

In March 2018, Panama sanctioned 55 public officials, including Isaías Rodríguez.

During 2018 until 2019 he worked as the Venezuelan Ambassador in Italy. During the 2019 Venezuelan presidential crisis, Rodríguez expressed concern for US sanctions on Venezuela. According to him, these sanctions prevent him to pay his workers and the Embassy debt has risen to about 9 million euros. Rodríguez resigned to his job as ambassador in May due to the tight budget of the embassy. In his resignation letter published on Twitter, he expressed support for "Maduro's battle". He writes that he leaves "without money" and that Italian banks have "closed its doors" to him.

References

Living people
1942 births
Ambassadors of Venezuela to Italy
20th-century Venezuelan lawyers
Democratic Action (Venezuela) politicians
People's Electoral Movement (Venezuela) politicians
Members of the Senate of Venezuela
Vice presidents of Venezuela
United Socialist Party of Venezuela politicians
People from Valle de la Pascua
People of the Crisis in Venezuela
Members of the Venezuelan Constituent Assembly of 1999
Members of the Venezuelan Constituent Assembly of 2017